William Jack (20 December 1930 – 9 December 2008) was a British sprinter. He competed in the men's 100 metres at the 1952 Summer Olympics.

Competition record

References

External links
 

1930 births
2008 deaths
Athletes (track and field) at the 1952 Summer Olympics
British male sprinters
Olympic athletes of Great Britain
Place of birth missing